Alibeyk Sara (also Romanized as ‘Alībeyk Sarā) is a village in Malfejan Rural District, in the Central District of Siahkal County, Gilan Province, Iran. At the 2006 census, its population was 79, in 26 families.

References 

Populated places in Siahkal County